Akiva ben Jacob Frankfurt (died 1597), also known as Akiva ben Jacob Günzburg, was a German poet and rabbi. 

He was the son of Jacob Flesch of Prague, and the son-in-law of Rabbi Simeon Günzburg of Frankfurt, with whose congregation he was associated as preacher, and by whose name he came to be known. His grandson was the scholar Abraham Flesch (–1640).

Works
  Prayers and songs for the days of the week.
  Songs for the Sabbath, some of which have been translated into Judæo-German, with notes in Hebrew.
  A dispute between wine and water, in verse, with a translation in Judæo-German. Published together with the two preceding, and separately, Amsterdam, 1759.
  Songs for Sabbath evening.

References
 

1597 deaths
16th-century German poets
16th-century German rabbis
16th-century Jews
Jewish German writers